Michael H. Corbin (born 1960) is a United States career foreign service officer and diplomat. He served as the United States Ambassador to the United Arab Emirates. He was nominated to the post on May 9, 2011, confirmed by the U.S. Senate on June 30, and sworn in by Under Secretary of State for Political Affairs William J. Burns on July 25. He arrived in Abu Dhabi on July 27 and presented his credentials to Undersecretary of the Ministry of Foreign Affairs Juma Mubarak Al Junaibi on July 29, and to President Khalifa bin Zayed Al Nahyan on September 19, 2011.

He graduated from Swarthmore College, with a B.A. 
He served in the Peace Corps in Mauritania, from 1982 to 1984.
He was the Minister Counselor, for Economic and Political Affairs in Egypt, from 2003 to 2006. 
He was Chargé d'Affaires in Syria, from 2006 to 2008.
He was Minister Counselor, for Political-Military Affairs in Iraq from 2008 to 2009.
He was the Deputy Assistant Secretary of State, in the Bureau of Near Eastern Affairs, 2009–11.

He also serves on the board of directors for Caliburn International, a military contractor that oversees operations for Homestead Temporary Shelter for Unaccompanied Children.

References

External links

"U.S. Transition in Iraq", August 16, 2010

1960 births
Swarthmore College alumni
Peace Corps volunteers
Living people
United States Department of State officials
Ambassadors of the United States to Syria
Ambassadors of the United States to the United Arab Emirates
American expatriates in Mauritania
United States Foreign Service personnel